The 1944 Second Air Force Superbombers football team represented the Second Air Force during the 1944 college football season. The team, based in Colorado Springs, Colorado, compiled a 10–4–1 record, outscored opponents by a total of 513 to 76, and was ranked No. 20 in the final AP Poll.

The team played many of the other leading service teams, losing to Randolph Field (No. 3 in the final AP Poll), Iowa Pre-Flight (No. 6), and Norman NAS (No. 14), and a Third Air Force team led by Charley Trippi.  The Superbombers also played to a tie against March Field (No. 10).

Major William B. "Red" Reese, who coached football and basketball at Eastern Washington College before the war, was the team's head coach. Notable players on the 1944 Second Air Force squad included Glenn Dobbs, Bill Sewell, Don Fambrough, Nick Susoeff, Ray Evans, John Harrington, Johnny Strzykalski, and Visco Grgich.

Schedule

References

Second Air Force
Second Air Force Superbombers football seasons
Second Air Force Superbombers football